The third series of the BBC family sitcom My Family originally aired between 6 September 2002 and 25 December 2002. The series was commissioned following consistently high ratings for the second series. The opening episode of the series, "Absent Vixen, Cheeky Monkey", re-introduces the five main characters, but also writes out the character of Janey, who plays only a recurring role in this series. In Episode 3, Abi Harper, played by Siobhan Hayes, is introduced to replace Janey. All fourteen episodes in the third series are thirty minutes in length, including the Christmas special. The series was once again produced by Rude Boy Productions, a company that produces comedies created by Fred Barron. The series was filmed at Pinewood Studios in London, in front of a live audience.

Episode Information

Reception

Viewers
The series was once again given a prime-time Friday evening slot, airing regularly at 8:30pm. The first episode of the series gained 8.10 million viewers, a considerably less amount than the second series – however, it was the third highest rating for the week. The third series averaged 7.20 million viewers for each episode.

References

External links
My Family: Series Three at the British Comedy Guide
My Family: Series Three at My Family Online
BBC Comedy- My Family Series 3

2002 British television seasons